The U.S. state of Hawaii, which covers the Hawaiian Islands, is tropical but it experiences many different climates, depending on altitude and surroundings. The island of Hawaii for example hosts 4 (out of 5 in total) climate groups on a surface as small as  according to the Köppen climate types: tropical, arid, temperate and polar. When counting also the Köppen sub-categories  notably including the very rare cold-summer mediterranean climate  the island of Hawaii hosts 10 (out of 14 in total) climate zones. The islands receive most rainfall from the trade winds on their north and east flanks (the windward side) as a result of orographic precipitation. Coastal areas are drier, especially the south and west side or leeward sides.

The Hawaiian Islands receive most of their precipitation from October to April. Drier conditions generally prevail from May to September. Due to cooler waters around Hawaii, the risk of tropical cyclones is low for Hawaii.

Temperature
Temperatures at sea level generally range from highs of  during the summer months to  during the winter months. Rarely does the temperature rise from above  or drop below  at lower elevations. Temperatures are lower at higher altitudes. During the winter, snowfall is common at the summits of Mauna Kea and Mauna Loa on Hawaii Island.

In the leeward areas, temperatures may reach into the low 90s several days during the year, but temperatures higher than these are unusual. In the United States, only Florida has warmer surf temperatures.

The Pacific High, and with it the trade-wind zone, moves north and south with changing angle of the sun, so that it reaches its northernmost position in the summer. This brings trade winds during the period of May through September, when they are prevalent 80 to 95 percent of the time. From October through April, the heart of the trade winds moves south of Hawaii; thus there average wind speeds are lower across the islands. Due to Hawaii being at the northern edge of the tropics (mostly above 20 latitude), there are only weak wet and dry seasons unlike many tropical climates.

Winds
Island wind patterns are very complex. Though the trade winds are fairly constant, their relatively uniform air flow is distorted and disrupted by mountains, hills, and valleys. Usually winds blow upslope by day and downslope by night. Local conditions that produce occasional violent winds are not well understood. The Kula winds are strong downslope winds on the lower slopes of the west side of Haleakalā.

The Lahaina winds are also downslope winds, but are somewhat different. They are also called "lehua winds" after the ōhia lehua (Metrosideros polymorpha), whose red blossoms fill the air when these strong winds blow. They issue from canyons at the base of the western Maui mountains, where steeper canyon slopes meet the more gentle piedmont slope below. These winds only occur every 8 to 12 years.

Cloud formation
Below these heights, the air is moist; above, it is dry. The break (a large-scale feature of the Pacific High) is caused by a temperature inversion embedded in the moving trade wind air. The inversion tends to suppress the vertical movement of air and so restricts cloud development to the zone just below the inversion. On trade wind days when the inversion is well defined, the clouds develop below these heights with only an occasional cloud top breaking through the inversion.

These towering clouds form along the mountains where the incoming trade wind air converges as it moves up a valley and is forced up and over the mountains to heights of several thousand feet. On days without an inversion, the sky is almost cloudless (completely cloudless skies are extremely rare). In leeward areas well screened from the trade winds (such as the west coast of Maui), skies are clear 30 to 60 percent of the time.

Windward areas tend to be cloudier during the summer, when the trade winds and associated clouds are more prevalent, while leeward areas, which are less affected by cloudy conditions associated with trade wind cloudiness, tend to be cloudier during the winter, when storm fronts pass through more frequently. In these locations the sky is cloudy more than 70 percent of the time. The usual clarity of the air in the high mountains is associated with the low moisture content of the air.

Precipitation
Hawaii differs from many tropical locations with pronounced wet and dry seasons, in that the wet season coincides with the winter months (rather than the summer months more typical of other places in the tropics). For instance, Honolulu's Köppen climate classification is the rare As wet-winter subcategory of the tropical wet and dry climate type.

Major storms occur most frequently in October through March. There may be as many as six or seven major storm events in a year. Such storms bring heavy rains and can be accompanied by strong local winds. The storms may be associated with the passage of a cold front, the leading edge of a mass of relatively cool air that is moving from west to east or from northwest to southeast.

Windward slopes have greater rainfall than leeward lowlands and tall mountains. 

The usual run of trade wind weather yields many light showers in the lowlands, whereas torrential rains are associated with a sudden surge in the trade winds or with a major storm.

Severe thunderstorms, as defined by the National Weather Service (NWS) as tornadoes, hail  or larger, and/or convective winds of at least  occur but are relatively uncommon. Nontornadic waterspouts are more common than tornadoes produced by supercells, which produce stronger, longer lasting tornadoes, especially with respect to inland areas, and also produce the largest hail, such as the 2012 Hawaii hailstorm. An annual average of approximately one tornado, either emanating from supercells or by other processes, occurs.

Kona storms are features of the winter season. The name comes from winds out of the "kona" or usually leeward direction. Rainfall in a well-developed Kona storm is widespread and more prolonged than in the usual cold-front storm. Kona storm rains are usually most intense in an arc, extending from south to east of the storm and well in advance of its center. Kona rains last from several hours to several days. The rains may continue steadily, but the longer lasting ones are characteristically interrupted by intervals of lighter rain or partial clearing, as well as by intense showers superimposed on the more moderate continuous, steady rain. An entire winter may pass without a single well-developed Kona storm. More often there are one or two such storms a year; sometimes four or five.

Hurricanes

The hurricane season in the Hawaiian Islands is roughly from June through November, when hurricanes and tropical storms are most probable in the North Pacific. These storms tend to originate off the coast of Mexico (particularly the Baja California peninsula) and track west or northwest towards the islands. As storms cross the Pacific, they tend to lose strength if they bear northward and encounter cooler water.

True hurricanes are rare in Hawaii, thanks in part to the comparatively cool waters around the islands as well as unfavorable atmospheric conditions, such as enhanced wind shear; only four have affected the islands during 63 years. Tropical storms are more frequent. These have more modest winds, below . Because tropical storms resemble Kona storms, and because early records do not distinguish clearly between them, it has been difficult to estimate the average frequency of tropical storms. Every year or two a tropical storm will affect the weather in some part of the islands. Unlike cold fronts and Kona storms, hurricanes and tropical storms are most likely to occur during the last half of the year, from July through December. Three strong and destructive hurricanes are known to have made landfall on the islands, an unnamed storm in 1871, Hurricane Dot in 1959, and Hurricane Iniki in 1992. Another hurricane, Iwa, caused significant damage in 1982 but its center passed nearby and did not directly make landfall. The rarity of hurricanes making landfall on the Islands is subject to change as the climate warms. In the Pliocene era, where  levels were comparable to those we see today, the waters around Hawaii were much warmer, resulting in frequent hurricane strikes in computer simulations.

Effect on trade winds

Despite being small islands within the vast Pacific Ocean, the Hawaiian Islands have a surprising effect on ocean currents and circulation patterns over much of the Pacific. In the Northern Hemisphere, trade winds blow from northeast to southwest, from North and South America toward Asia, between the equator and 30 degrees north latitude. Typically, the trade winds continue across the Pacific — unless something gets in their way, like an island.

Hawaii's high mountains present a substantial obstacle to the trade winds. The elevated topography blocks the airflow, effectively splitting the trade winds in two. This split causes a zone of weak winds, called a "wind wake", on the leeward side of the islands.

Aerodynamic theory indicates that an island wind wake effect should dissipate within a few hundred kilometers and not be felt in the western Pacific. However, the wind wake caused by the Hawaiian Islands extends , roughly 10 times longer than any other wake. The long wake testifies to the strong interaction between the atmosphere and ocean, which has strong implications for global climate research. It is also important for understanding natural climate variations, like El Niño.

There are number of reasons why this has been observed only in Hawaii. First, the ocean reacts slowly to fast-changing winds; winds must be steady to exert force on the ocean, such as the trade winds. Second, the high mountain topography provides a significant disturbance to the winds. Third, the Hawaiian Islands are large in horizontal (east-west) scale, extending over four degrees in longitude. It is this active interaction between wind, ocean current, and temperature that creates this uniquely long wake west of Hawaii.

The wind wake drives an eastward "counter current" that brings warm water  from the Asian coast. This warm water drives further changes in wind, allowing the island effect to extend far into the western Pacific. The counter current had been observed by oceanographers near the Hawaiian Islands years before the long wake was discovered, but they did not know what caused it.

Statistics

State

Major cities

See also
Climate of the United States
Climate of Hawaii, with an interactive map, from the Geography Department, University of Hawaiʻi at Mānoa

Notes

References

 
Hawaii